This is a list of the bishops and archbishops of the Roman Catholic Archdiocese of Sydney since 1842. The title also is the Catholic Primate of Australia.

List of bishops

List of archbishops

Auxiliary bishops

See also

Roman Catholicism in Australia
St Mary's Cathedral, Sydney

References

External links

 
Catholic Church in Australia
Archbishops of Sydney
Roman Catholic archbishops
Bishops